Stigmatogobius pleurostigma is a species of goby from the subfamily Gobionellinae that lives freshwater to brackish water in Southeast Asia.

References 
 FishBase: Stigmatogobius-pleurostigma

pleurostigma
Fish described in 1849